Hadewych Minis (born 5 January 1977) is a Dutch actress. She won the 2013 Golden Calf for Best Actress award for her performance as Marina in Borgman and was awarded the prestigious Theo d'Or prize for her solo performance in the Dutch adaptation of Dennis Kelly's play Girls & Boys.

Selected filmography

References

External links 

1977 births
Living people
Dutch film actresses
Golden Calf winners
21st-century Dutch actresses